Guillermo Torres Cervantes (born August 19, 1986 in Guadalajara, Jalisco) is a Mexican freestyle wrestler. He won a silver medal for the 60-kg division at the 2011 Pan American Games in his home turf, which gave him a qualifying place at the 2012 Summer Olympics in London. At the Olympics, Torres competed in the men's freestyle 60-kg class, where he was eliminated in the qualifying round, after being defeated by Iran's Masoud Esmaeilpour, with a technical score of 1–8, and a classification point system of 1–3.

References

External links
 

Olympic wrestlers of Mexico
Wrestlers at the 2011 Pan American Games
Sportspeople from Guadalajara, Jalisco
Wrestlers at the 2012 Summer Olympics
1986 births
Living people
Mexican male sport wrestlers
Pan American Games silver medalists for Mexico
Pan American Games medalists in wrestling
Medalists at the 2011 Pan American Games
20th-century Mexican people
21st-century Mexican people